Elmedin Kikanović (born 2 September 1988) is a Bosnian professional basketball player for Al Riyadi Club Beirut of the Lebanese Basketball League. He also represents the Bosnia and Herzegovina national team.

Professional career
Kikanović started his career with Sloboda Tuzla. From 2007 until his doping suspension in 2010 he played with Crvena zvezda. In June 2011, he signed with the Russian club Yenisey Krasnoyarsk. On 2 May 2015 he joined French club SLUC Nancy for the rest of the season. On 21 July 2015 he signed a two-year deal with the German club Alba Berlin.

On 17 July 2017, Kikanović signed with AS Monaco for the 2017–18 season. He won the Leaders Cup with Monaco in 2018.

On 19 July 2019, Kikanović was announced by OGM Ormanspor of the Turkish Basketbol Süper Ligi (BSL).

On February 25, 2020, he has signed with Monaco of the LNB Pro A.

On May 21, 2020, he has signed with and returned to OGM Ormanspor of the Turkish Basketbol Süper Ligi (BSL).

In July 2021, Kikanovic joined Kuwait SC from Kuwait. On 9 October, he scored a game-high 22 points in the final of the 2021 Arab Club Basketball Championship, which Kuwait lost to Al Ahly.

In April 2022, he joined Al Riyadi Club Beirut of the Lebanese Basketball League.

National team career
Kikanović has also been a member of the Bosnia and Herzegovina national basketball team. With Bosnia's senior national team, he played at the EuroBasket 2011, EuroBasket 2013 and the EuroBasket 2015.

References

External links

 French League profile
 
 FIBA.com profile

1988 births
Living people
ABA League players
Alba Berlin players
Al Riyadi Club Beirut basketball players
AS Monaco Basket players
BC Enisey players
Bosnia and Herzegovina expatriate basketball people in Serbia
Bosnia and Herzegovina expatriate sportspeople in Monaco
Bosnia and Herzegovina expatriate sportspeople in Germany
Bosnia and Herzegovina men's basketball players
Bosniaks of Bosnia and Herzegovina
Centers (basketball)
Doping cases in basketball
Kuwait SC basketball players
KK Crvena zvezda players
KK Sloboda Tuzla players
OGM Ormanspor players
SLUC Nancy Basket players
Sportspeople from Tuzla